S.R. Kottegoda was a Sri Lankan academic and physician. He was the Head of the Department of Pharmacology of the Faculty of Medicine, University of Colombo, thereafter becoming Dean of the Faculty, and later National Coordinator, Health Systems Research, Ministry of Health. He joined the Department of Obstetrics and Gynaecology of the Faculty of Medicine of the National University of Singapore.

Kottegoda was a leading authority in the SLAAS on the subject of Ethics in Science, having established the oldest Ethics Review Committee in Sri Lanka.

Kottegoda is also the author of the definitive pictorial guide book ‘Flowers of Sri Lanka’.

References

Sinhalese physicians
Sri Lankan academic administrators
Alumni of Royal College, Colombo
Academic staff of the University of Colombo